The Lagonda 14/60 was a sports touring car introduced by Lagonda in 1925. Production of the 14/60 continued until 1931.  As well as the standard car there were variants called the 2 Litre Speed (1927–33) and Continental (1932 only).

The first part of its name referred to its Fiscal horsepower rating of 14 (actually 12.9) and the second part the engine output in bhp.

According to the Lagonda Club, around 1440 cars were made.

Engine and transmission
The engine was a new design for the car by Arthur Davidson who had been with Lea-Francis. The 4 cylinder, 1954 cc unit was notable for its valve gear.  Two camshafts were mounted high on each side of the engine block and operated the overhead valves via rockers mounted in the head that had fingers that followed the camshafts. This allowed the cylinder head, which unlike previous Lagondas was detachable, with its hemi-spherical combustion chambers to be removed without disturbing the valve timing. This was important at the time as decarbonizing and valve grinding were regularly required, before the introduction of lead in the petrol to lubricate the valve seats. Unfortunately the resulting geometry included very restrictive inlet airways to the valves, limiting performance. The camshafts were driven by a two-stage chain arrangement; the first chain also drove the dynamo, oil and water pumps. The crankshaft was carried in five main bearings. A single Zenith carburettor was fitted. With a bore of 72mm and stroke of 120mm the engine was said to produce 60bhp at 3500rpm.

The four-speed gearbox was separate from the engine and driven through a single dry-plate clutch. An open shaft then went to the spiral-bevel rear axle.

Chassis and suspension

The chassis design was by A. E. Masters  and consisted of side members held apart by a combination of tubular and channel cross members. Semi-elliptical leaf springs were fitted front and rear.  drum brakes operated by rods and cables were fitted on all four wheels with separate shoes in the rear brakes for the handbrake.

Coachwork

Three standard body styles were available for the 14/60, a saloon, a tourer and an open semi-sports with V-shaped windscreen. The saloon and tourer were designed to accommodate five people but the slightly narrower sports only four. Early cars were fitted with steel artillery type wheels but later cars had wire wheels. Some chassis went to external coachbuilders.

2 Litre Speed Model

In 1927 the Speed model was announced. The engine was tuned to give 70 bhp by raising the compression ratio and with a lighter body was guaranteed to reach . The chassis was modified to allow the engine to be mounted  further back giving a much longer bonnet. Standard bodies were a tourer or fabric saloon.

For 1929 the chassis was further modified and has become known as the "low-chassis" version. The radiator was also altered as the dynamo was moved to the front of the crankshaft.

A Cozette supercharger was fitted to most examples, but other types were also tried. The supercharger was intended to improve engine torque and reduce the need for gearchanging, which many drivers hated in the days before syncromesh. These vane type superchargers were theoretically the most efficient type available, but their durability issues became notorious, and they failed to deliver torque where it was most needed to avoid gearchanging, at low engine revs. Owners liked the performance, but only a few escaped failures, which were expensive. With hindsight the more durable Roots type (e.g. Bentley) might have been a better choice, but would have required significant redesign as there was not sufficient space available in the Speed Model to package it. Another better choice might have been a redesigned cylinder head with downdraught inlet passages, delivering more performance without a supercharger. Both these alternatives would have required significant investment, but Lagonda was chronically short of money. A supercharger, on the other hand, was a performance option, required less redesign and could justify an addition to the price, unlike a new cylinder head which was less visible to the customer. Interestingly Lagonda's performance dilemma arose from its efforts to reduce the burden of servicing the car by making the cylinder head easy to remove. (These efforts were also seen in other design features of the car, like an oil drain that could be operated from a standing position, and grease nipples with pipes arranged so that all greasing could be done from one place). Lagonda apparently feared that the 1930's gentleman driver might have to service the car without the aid of a chauffeur, and so they priotitized the reduction of servicing effort at the expense of performance. This appears with hindsight to have been a misjudgment; most cars developed through the 1930s without such features, and owners either did the work themselves or took the car to garages instead. The supercharger itself then fell out of fashion with most manufacturers as the 1930s progressed, possibly because of the invention of synchromesh, which alleviated the noisy and embarrassing problem of the inexpert driver changing gear with a "crash box".

Continental

In 1932 a new model was announced called the Continental. Its tourer body was made of steel and the radiator was inclined slightly and had thermostatic shutters. Cycle type front wings were fitted and there were large Lucas P100 headlamps. The car cost an extra GBP30 and 23 were made.

References

14 60
Cars introduced in 1925